Mazdoor Mukti Morcha (Workers Liberation Front), the Punjab affiliate of the All India Agricultural Labour Association, the agriworker wing of Communist Party of India (Marxist-Leninist) Liberation.

Trade unions in India
Indian agriculture and forestry trade unions